Louise Seiersen (born 10 January 1991) is a Danish female badminton player.

Achievements

BWF International Challenge/Series
Women's Doubles

 BWF International Challenge tournament
 BWF International Series tournament
 BWF Future Series tournament

References

External links
 
 

1991 births
Living people
Danish female badminton players
People from Hvidovre Municipality
Sportspeople from the Capital Region of Denmark
21st-century Danish women